Peatonal Sarandí is the main pedestrian street of Ciudad Vieja in Montevideo, Uruguay, and the most frequented tourist venue of the city. It starts from the Ciudadela, runs along Plaza Constitución (commonly called Plaza Matriz) and ends at the Rambla (the coastal avenue), at the eastern end of Ciudad Vieja. As an extension of this street is the long southern breakwater of the Port of Montevideo, which has taken on the name "Escollera Sarandí".

Many buildings of architectural value are to be seen along Peatonal Sarandí, as well as art galleries and many shops and businesses. Some of its landmarks are the Edificio Pablo Ferrando, which is next to the Museo Torres García, the Plaza Fuerte Hotel, the Club Uruguay on Plaza Constitución, the Cabildo, which houses the municipal archive of the city and is also a national monument and museum, and the Montevideo Metropolitan Cathedral, commonly known as Iglesia Matriz, which also gives to the square the popular naming Plaza Matriz.

External links
Peatonal Sarandí - Intendencia Municipal de Montevideo

Streets in Montevideo
Tourism in Uruguay
Ciudad Vieja, Montevideo